Footscray Park  is one of the largest and most intact examples of an Edwardian park in Australia. The 15-hectare park is located on the south bank of the Maribyrnong River in Footscray in Victoria. It is classified as a heritage place on the Victorian Heritage Register for its aesthetic, horticultural and social significance to the State of Victoria and was the first gardens to be placed on the register. The park is noted for its botanical collection, ornamental ponds and garden structures.

The park is managed both by the Maribyrnong City Council and Parks Victoria.

History

The park was established following lobbying by local citizens to establish parkland on the site. The original layout of the park was designed by architect Rodney Alsop, who won a design competition for the park in 1911. The Footscray Park Beautification Committee was formed by the residents and supported by local businesses and individuals. Much of the work was carried out by volunteers, including local Boy Scouts.  By 1914 the park already had a large collection of Australian native species, predominantly Eucalyptus and Acacias. Many of the gardens structures including arbours, bridges and ponds were constructed by unemployed Victorians during the Depression. The majority of the layout and installation of features was carried out under the direction of David Mathews who was Superintendent of Parks and Gardens for the City of Footscray  between 1916 and 1964. William Nicholls, an orchid specialist, also assisted in the task.

The slopes of the park were a vantage point for a crowd of 40,000 to see Bert Hinkler land his plane at Flemington Racecourse in 1928 as part of an Australian tour following his successful completion of the first solo flight from England to Australia. The park has been the venue for two large Melbourne events - The Saltwater Festival and the Vietnamese Festival.

Park layout and features

The entrance to the park on Ballarat Road features stone walls and wrought iron grates which incorporate the wording "Footscray Park". A World War I memorial was unveiled in 1922 stands at the entranceway. It features an Italian-sculpted marble statue of Victory on a granite base.

A rustic stone columned lookout shelter and pergola which was designed and built by students from Footscray Technical School in 1928 has a view toward the Maribyrnong River and Flemington Racecourse. Nearby a mounted bust of Henry Lawson honours the Australian poet and writer and the inaugural Henry Lawson Literary Society commemorative event held in the park.

The park has two (originally three) major paths running east–west along the embankment which are bisected by a north–south path (the T.B. Drew Memorial Walk) which descends the embankment through a wisteria-covered arbour to Thomson Water Garden.

The Alfred Green Memorial Fountain (locally known as the "platypus fountain") is an unusual granite fountain that is supported at its base by two sculpted platypus.

The park also has open playing fields on the flat area near the river.

Trees
The park has a diverse collection of mature trees, including palms, elms, ash, oaks, cypress, various Australian species as well as a number of species which are rare in cultivation in Australia. The following trees are cited in its heritage listing:

Brahea armata (Blue Hesper Palm)
Clerodendrum glabrum (2 trees) 
Cupressus macrocarpa 'Hodginsii'
Ficus microcarpa var. hillii  (Hill's Fig) 
Melaleuca halmaturorum
Quercus aff. stellata 
Vitex agnus-castus
 Ulmus glabra 'Exoniensis' (Exeter Elm)

Events
Since 2012, the park holds annual New Year's Eve firework displays and celebrations at the banks of the Maribyrnong River, the second largest New Year's Eve event in Melbourne behind celebrations in Melbourne's CBD. However, the celebrations were not held in 2020 due to the COVID-19 pandemic in Victoria.

References

External links
 Heritage Council of Victoria: Footscray Park
 The Footscray Historical Society: The Citizens' Memorial Statue – Victory

Heritage sites in Melbourne
Parks in Melbourne
City of Maribyrnong